Fissurella cumingi is a species of sea snail, a marine gastropod mollusk in the family Fissurellidae, the keyhole limpets.

Description
The size of an adult shell varies between 80 mm and 100 mm.

Distribution
This species is distributed in the Pacific Ocean along Chile.

References

External links
  McLean J.H. (1984) Systematics of Fissurella in the Peruvian and Magellanic faunal provinces (Gastropoda: Prosobranchia). Contributions in Science, Natural History Museum of Los Angeles County 354: 1–70, p. 49. (29 October 1984) 
 

Fissurellidae
Gastropods described in 1849
Endemic fauna of Chile